The following is a list of Collingwood Football Club leading goalkickers in each season of the Australian Football League (formerly the Victorian Football League) and AFL Women's.

VFL/AFL
The following players finished as the leading goalkicker in the respective VFL/AFL season:

AFL Women's

References

Goalkickers
Collingwood Football Club goalkickers
Collingwood Football Club goalkickers